Nasirabad (also Romanized as Naşīrābād; also known as Nāşerābād and Naşrābād) is a village in Khandan Rural District, Tarom Sofla District, Qazvin County, Qazvin Province, Iran. At the 2006 census, its population was 19, in 10 families.

References 

Populated places in Qazvin County